Wu Wenkai (born 28 November 1970) is a Chinese badminton player. He competed in the men's singles tournament at the 1992 Summer Olympics.

Achievements

World Cup 
Men's singles

Asian Championships 
Men's singles

IBF World Grand Prix 
The World Badminton Grand Prix sanctioned by International Badminton Federation (IBF) from 1983 to 2006.
 
Men's singles

IBF International 
Men's singles

References

1970 births
Living people
Chinese male badminton players
Olympic badminton players of China
Badminton players at the 1992 Summer Olympics
Place of birth missing (living people)
Asian Games gold medalists for China
Medalists at the 1990 Asian Games
Asian Games medalists in badminton
Badminton players at the 1990 Asian Games